Alix Delaporte (born 1969) is a French film director and screenwriter.

Life and career
Delaporte studied at the London School of Economics between 1988 and 1989, and in 1993, she obtained a master's degree in contemporary history. During her screenwriting studies at La Fémis from 1999 to 2000, Delaporte worked as a reporter and cameraperson at the CAPA Agency and collaborated on a number of television shows. In 2006, her short film How Do You Brake Going Downhill? (Comment on freine dans une descente ?) was screened at the 63rd Venice International Film Festival, where it won the Silver Lion for Best Short Film. In 2012, her debut feature film Angel & Tony earned three nominations at the 37th César Awards and won newcomer awards for lead actors Clotilde Hesme and Grégory Gadebois. Her next film, The Last Hammer Blow, played in competition at the 71st Venice International Film Festival. Romain Paul, who played the son of Clothilde Hesme and Grégory Gadebois' characters, won the Marcello Mastroianni Award for his performance in the film.

In 2015, she was part of the jury for the Horizons section of the 72nd Venice International Film Festival.

Filmography

References

External links

 

1969 births
Living people
French film directors
French women film directors
French women screenwriters
French screenwriters
People from Chatou